Manikonda Chalapathi Rau (also known as MC and Magnus) (1910 – 25 March 1983) was an Indian journalist and an authority on the Nehruvian thought.  Rau was editor of the English-language daily National Herald of Lucknow for over thirty years from 1946. The National Herald was founded by Jawaharlal Nehru in 1938. He wrote several books on Indian journalism, politics and personalities. During the independence struggle he was part of the underground press movement.

He was the first president of the Indian Federation of Working Journalists (in 1950) and continued to be so till 1955. He was the leader of the Indian Press Delegation, which accompanied Nehru on his historic 1955 tour of the USSR, Poland and Yugoslavia. He was a member of the Indian government's goodwill mission to China in 1952.

He was a member of the UNESCO Press Experts Committee and also worked on various UNESCO Commissions. He was India's representative to the United Nations General Assembly (1958). He was also a member of the Initiating Committee of the International Press Institute.

Rau, a recipient of the civilian honour of the Padma Bhushan, died on 25 March 1983.

Bibliography

Chalapathi Rau, M. Fragments of a revolution; essays on Indian problems. Oxford, New York, Pergamon Press [1965] [1st ed.]
Chalapathi Rau, M. Gandhi and Nehru. Bombay, New York, Allied Publishers [1967]
Govind Ballabh Pant, his life and times / M. Chalapathi Rau. New Delhi : Allied, 1981.
India : portrait of a people / produced by India Tourism Development Corporation; commentary by M. Chalapathi Rau ; design and picture editing by Zehra Tyabji and T. S. Nagarajan. New Delhi : Ministry of External Affairs, Govt. of India, c1976.
Jawaharlal Nehru [by] M. Chalapathi Rau. [New Delhi] Publications Division, Ministry of Information and Broadcasting, Govt. of India [1973]
Journalism and politics / M. Chalapathi Rau. New Delhi : Vikas, c1984.
Magnus & muses : "off the record" musings of 'MC' (M. Chalapathi Rau) / compiled and edited by Harindra Srivastava. Gurgaon : Academic Press, 1980.
The press / M. Chalapathi Rau. New Delhi : National Book Trust, India, 1974.
The press in India [by] M. Chalapathi Rau. Bombay, New York, Allied Publishers [1968]
Selected works of Jawaharlal Nehru. [Advisory board: M. Chalapathi N. Y. Sharada Prasad, and B. R. Nanda;general editor: S. Gopal. New Delhi, Orient Longman [1972-
Twenty-five years of Indian independence. Edited by Jag Mohan. Contributors: M. Chalapathi Rau [and others], Delhi, Vikas Pub. House [1973]

References

External links
Signed message by Nehru about the National Herald and Chalapathi Rau
About MC by Indian National Leaders 
Chalapati Rau among top Indian editors
Chalapati Rau as unofficial media advisor of Nehru
An article by Derek Ingram titled "The Commonwealth and the media" in The Round Table Journal Volume 93, Number 376 / September, 2004, pp. 561–569, mentions Chalapati Rau as one of the top journalists in Pre-Independent India.

1910 births
1983 deaths
20th-century Indian journalists
Indian newspaper editors
Writers from Lucknow
Recipients of the Padma Bhushan in literature & education
Journalists from Uttar Pradesh
Indian male journalists